Campagne-lès-Guines (literally Campagne near Guines) is a commune in the Pas-de-Calais department in the Nord-Pas de Calais  region of France.

Geography
A farming village located 10 miles (16 km) south of Calais, on the D248 and D215 road junction.

History
The meeting between Francis I and Henry VIII took place here at Campagne-lès-Guînes in 1546 to conclude the peace treaty of Ardres, which saw Boulogne returned to the French crown, for a sizeable sum of money.

Population

Places of interest
 The church of St.Martin, dating from the nineteenth century.
 The nineteenth-century château..

See also
Communes of the Pas-de-Calais department

References

Campagnelesguines
Pale of Calais